OVL may refer to:

 OVL (file format)
 Lobaev Sniper Rifle
 Overlay (programming)
 Open Verification Library